Ákos from the kindred Ákos, better known as Magister Ákos was a Hungarian cleric and chronicler in the 13th century.

Life and career
He was a member of the gens (clan) Ákos as the son of Matthew. He had two brothers, Philip, who served as ispán of Gömör (1244), then Veszprém Counties (1247), and Derek, who governed Győr County in 1257. Possibly Ákos, who entered ecclesiastical career, was the youngest brother among three of them.

It is possible that Ákos raised in the court of Coloman of Galicia-Lodomeria, a younger son of Andrew II of Hungary. Probably he studied abroad as his work proves that he had an excellent knowledge of the canon law of the Catholic Church and its reference method. Raymond of Penyafort compiled the Decretals of Gregory IX by September 1234, the Pope announced the new publication in a Bull directed to the doctors and students of Paris and Bologna, commanding that the work of Raymond alone should be considered authoritative, and should alone be used in the schools. Ákos was already referred to as magister in 1240, confirming that he studied arts and canon law in youth and not at peek of his ecclesiastical career.

Ákos was present at the coronation of Béla IV on 14 October 1235, as he gave a detailed account of the event in his gesta. According to his report, Duke Coloman carried the royal sword, while Daniel of Galicia led the king's horse at the head of the procession. Ákos was a vicar in Pest between 1235 and 1244, later became royal chaplain for King Béla. He was one of the crown guards from 1246 to 1251, after that he served as canon of Székesfehérvár between 1248 and 1251. Besides that he functioned as chancellor for Queen Maria Laskarina, the wife of Béla IV from 1248 until 1261. He was also provost of Buda. For the last decade of his life, Ákos functioned as caretaker and patron of the Dominican monastery in the Margaret Island. Following the death of Béla IV, he retired from public life and resided in the provost's palace at Óbuda. He wrote his gesta there.

In 1270, after Stephen V's accession to the throne, Ákos was among the members of the Hungarian delegation sent to Naples which escorted the c. twelve-year-old princess Mary to marry Charles the Lame. According to historian Elemér Mályusz, Ákos was the leader of the Hungarian delegation to Naples.

Even after the sudden death of Stephen V in August 1272, Ákos has retained his influence and remained head of the royal chapel during the reign of the minor Ladislaus IV. Ákos died after 24 August 1273, when he was last mentioned by contemporary sources. Benedict, his successor in the position of provost of Buda already appeared in a document in late 1273, suggesting that Ákos died in that year.

His gesta
He was the author of the gesta which was later revised by Simon of Kéza in his work, the Gesta Hunnorum et Hungarorum. In historiography, Ákos was first identified as the author of the gesta from King Stephen V's age by medievalist György Györffy in 1948, while previously Gyula Pauler and Sándor Domanovszky had already referred to an unidentified chronicler between the ages of Anonymus and Simon of Kéza, whose some texts were preserved by the 14th-century chronicle composition. Ákos' chronicle was mostly based on the so-called "ancient gesta" which had lost by today. Ákos preserved several legends such as Lehel's horn myth, later also transcribed by the Illuminated Chronicle, and the Saint Eustace legend with Hungarian motifs and persons, Dukes Géza and Ladislaus. Accordingly, they hunting a stag in Vác, where saw a vision of a burning candle lodged between the stag's antlers. Following that King Géza built the first cathedral in that place.

Ákos' work was aristocratic in its tone, as himself was also a member of a powerful kindred which rose by the 13th century; he prepared the story of seven chieftains of the Magyars which can be found in the 14th century chronicle collection (as Anonymus' Gesta Hungarorum was lost until the 18th century). However, Ákos also emphasized that the ancestors of the kindreds of his age actively participated too in the conquest of the Carpathian Basin in late 9th century, and contrary to Anonymus, he did not identify the seven chieftains with the whole Hungarian nation. Ákos even emphasized that Árpád was the first "first among equals" who had right to march in front during the conquest – referring duty of monarchs preserved from the "Scythian heritage", he argued.

In his work, Ákos called the group of aristocracy of his time as communitas, suggesting equal rights and duties among them, and preventing the emergence of certain clans in their ranks (called barons, which term was refused by Ákos, who used the "nobilis" phrase). Historian Mályusz argued the chronicler's idea of communitas marked an argument for oligarchic form of society, while later Simon of Kéza has extended it to the whole lesser nobility. Ákos sought to link genealogically the prominent kindreds of his age with 9th–10th century individuals who participated in the Hungarian conquest or took a major role in the foundation of the Christian state. For instance, by the usage of incorrectly dated historical events, he claimed chieftain Szabolcs was the forefather of the Csák clan, while he connected the gyulas to the Kán kindred and its first prominent member, Julius I (Gyula).

By comparison to Simon of Kéza, magister Ákos did not attach much importance to the xenophobic phenomenon. According to his gesta, he preferred the social status against ethnicity. Ákos considered the advena ("newcomer", foreign-origin) kindreds as equals to the ancient ones. In this spirit, he highlighted that the German knights from whom the Hont-Pázmány kindred originated, had already fought for Christ when the Hungarians were still pagans. Rejecting Hont and Pázmány's mercenary role and commoner status, Ákos even claimed that Grand Prince Stephen sought assistance personally in his fight against Koppány from them, claiming members of European "royal dynasties". Ákos also suggested the Hahóts were descendants of the Counts of Weimar-Orlamünde, increasing their importance. Proving the chronicler's ability of historiographical invention, Ákos linked the contemporary ispán Keled's kinship to a fictional 12th century German royal family, the Counts of Hersfeld, even refused by the Kórógyis, later 14th-century members of the family. Ákos possibly intentionally placed the arrival of Héder, forefather of the contemporary Henry Kőszegi and his powerful family, to the age of Grand Prince Géza (r. 972–997), while in fact, the German knight came to Hungary during the reign of Géza II in the 1140s. In other aspects, the magister correctly named the places of the origins of the Hermán, Smaragd and Gutkeled kindreds. Summarizing, Ákos only considered the importance of the assimilation process of advena kindreds, stressing the marriage and relation ties with the ancient Hungarian clans.

Direct borrowings from Godfrey of Viterbo's Pantheon, Roger of Torre Maggiore's Carmen Miserabile and Thomas the Archdeacon's Historia Salonitana prove that Ákos used these works beside the "ancient gesta".

References

Sources
 Engel, Pál (2001). The Realm of St Stephen: A History of Medieval Hungary, 895-1526. I.B. Tauris Publishers. .
  Kristó, Gyula (1990). Magyar öntudat és idegenellenesség az Árpád-kori Magyarországon ("Hungarian Identity and Xenophobia in Árpádian Hungary"). Irodalomtörténeti Közlemények, Vol. XCIV. Issue 4. MTA Irodalomtudományi Intézete. Budapest. pp. 425–443. 
  Mályusz, Elemér (1971). Az V. István-kori geszta ("The Gesta of the Age of Stephen V"). Akadémiai Kiadó.
  Zsoldos, Attila (2011). Magyarország világi archontológiája, 1000–1301 ("Secular Archontology of Hungary, 1000–1301"). História, MTA Történettudományi Intézete. Budapest. 

13th-century Hungarian historians
1273 deaths
Ákos (genus)
Hungarian chroniclers
13th-century Hungarian Roman Catholic priests